N road may refer to:
 a number of National roads in different countries
 N roads in Malaysia are roads in Negeri Sembilan
 "N roads" in the Netherlands are Provinciale weg
 National routes in South Africa
 Corridor N, a highway in the U.S. states of Maryland and Pennsylvania
 N roads in Zimbabwe